Laura Vainionpää (born 11 April 1994) is a Finnish racing cyclist, who rides for Belgian amateur team S-Bikes–Doltcini. She rode in the women's road race at the UCI Road World Championships in 2016 and 2017, but she did not finish on either occasion.

Prior to her cycling career, Vainionpää was also a member of the Finland women's national under-18 ice hockey team at the 2012 IIHF World Women's U18 Championship, playing at forward.

Personal life
Her father Arto Vainionpää and brother Oskari Vainionpää are also road cyclists.

Major results
Source: 

2014
 National Road Championships
3rd Time trial
3rd Road race
2015
 2nd Road race, National Road Championships
2016
 2nd Road race, National Road Championships
2017
 3rd Time trial, National Road Championships
2022
 2nd Road race, National Road Championships
 7th Overall Tour of Uppsala

References

External links
 

1994 births
Living people
Finnish female cyclists
People from Kauhajoki
Finnish women's ice hockey forwards
Sportspeople from South Ostrobothnia